Sugar Creek Township is one of the seventeen townships of Stark County, Ohio, United States.  The 2000 census found 2,944 people in the township.

Geography
Located in the southwestern corner of the county, it borders the following townships:
Tuscarawas Township - north
Perry Township - northeast corner
Bethlehem Township - east
Franklin Township, Tuscarawas County - southeast
Wayne Township, Tuscarawas County - south
Paint Township, Holmes County - southwest
Paint Township, Wayne County - west
Sugar Creek Township, Wayne County - northwest

The most southerly township in the county, it is the only township in the county that borders Holmes County.

Three villages are located in Sugar Creek Township:
Beach City in the southeast
Brewster in the north
Wilmot in the southwest

Name and history

Named for its Sugar Creek, it is one of five Sugar Creek Townships statewide.

Government
The township is governed by a three-member board of trustees, who are elected in November of odd-numbered years to a four-year term beginning on the following January 1. Two are elected in the year after the presidential election and one is elected in the year before it. There is also an elected township fiscal officer, who serves a four-year term beginning on April 1 of the year after the election, which is held in November of the year before the presidential election. Vacancies in the fiscal officership or on the board of trustees are filled by the remaining trustees.

References

External links
County website

Townships in Stark County, Ohio
Townships in Ohio